Neomphaloidea is a superfamily of deep-sea snails or limpets,  marine gastropod mollusks. Neomphaloidea is the only superfamily in the order Neomphalida.

The order Neomphalida has the largest in situ radiation in hydrothermal vent habitats. Neomphalida is a major taxonomic grouping of sea snails, vent-endemic marine gastropod mollusks that form a very ancient lineage, going back to the Palaeozoic era.

2005 taxonomy
The superfamily Neomphaloidea was regarded for a long time as belonging within the clade Vetigastropoda. Superfamily Neomphaloidea was also classified in the clade Vetigastropoda according to the taxonomy of the Gastropoda by Bouchet & Rocroi, 2005.

2010 taxonomy
Molecular phylogeny showed however that it belongs in its own order , the Neomphalida, and that this clade is basal to the Vetigastropoda. The Neomphalina is, based on optimal phylogenetic analysis, a monophyletic clade, with uncertain relations among the gastropods.

Description
The anatomical characters of the Neomphaloidea largely follow the patterns as in the Vetigastropoda. However, unusual morphological and phylogentic characters suggest a different systematic position and place it in its own order, the Neomphalida. The formal placement of Neomphalida within the Gastropoda however remains ambiguous.

Families 
Families within the Neomphaloidea include:
 Melanodrymiidae Salvini-Plawen & Steiner, 1995
 Neomphalidae McLean, 1981
 Peltospiridae McLean, 1989

A few genera within Neomphaloidea have been unassigned to a family: 
 Helicrenion Warén & Bouchet, 1993
 Retiskenea Warén & Bouchet, 2001

Overview of species
Species within the Neomphaloidea include:
 Leptogyra alaskana Bartsch, 1910
 Leptogyra constricta B. A. Marshall, 1988
 Leptogyra costellata Warén & Bouchet, 2009
 Leptogyra eritmeta Bush, 1897
 Leptogyra inconspicua Bush, 1897
 Leptogyra inflata Warén & Bouchet, 1993
 Leptogyra patula B. A. Marshall, 1988
 Leptogyra verrilli Bush, 1897
 Leptogyropsis inflata Hasegawa, 1997
 Leptogyropsis kalinovoae B. A. Marshall, 1988
 Leptogyropsis kaltanae B. A. Marshall, 1988
 Melanodrymia aurantiaca Hickman, 1984
 Melanodrymia brightae Warén & Bouchet, 1993
 Melanodrymia galeronae Warén & Bouchet, 2001
 Xyleptogyra kapalae B. A. Marshall, 1988
 Cyathermia naticoides Warén & Bouchet, 1989
 Lacunoides exquisitus Warén & Bouchet, 1989
 Lacunoides vitreus Warén & Bouchet, 2001
 Lamellomphalus manusensis S.-Q. Zhang & S.-P. Zhang, 2017
 Neomphalus fretterae McLean, 1981
 Planorbidella depressa Warén & Bouchet, 1993
 Planorbidella planispira (Warén & Bouchet, 1989)
 Solutigyra reticulata Warén & Bouchet, 1989
 Symmetromphalus hageni L. Beck, 1992
 Symmetromphalus regularis McLean, 1990
 Chrysomallon squamiferum Chen, Linse, Copley & Rogers, 2015
 Ctenopelta porifera Warén & Bouchet, 1993
 Depressigyra globulus Warén & Bouchet, 1989
 Echinopelta fistulosa McLean, 1989
 Gigantopelta aegis Chen, Linse, Roterman, Copley & Rogers, 2015
 Gigantopelta chessoia Chen, Linse, Roterman, Copley & Rogers, 2015
 Hirtopelta hirta McLean, 1989
 Hirtopelta tufari L. Beck, 2002
 Lirapex costellatus Warén & Bouchet, 2001
 Lirapex granularis Warén & Bouchet, 1989
 Lirapex humatus Warén & Bouchet, 1989
 Nodopelta heminoda McLean, 1989
 Nodopelta rigneae Warén & Bouchet, 2001
 Nodopelta subnoda McLean, 1989
 Pachydermia laevis Warén & Bouchet, 1989
 Pachydermia sculpta Warén & Bouchet, 1993
 Peltospira delicata McLean, 1989
 Peltospira lamellifera Warén & Bouchet, 1989
 Peltospira operculata McLean, 1989
 Peltospira smaragdina Warén & Bouchet, 2001
 Rhynchopelta concentrica McLean, 1989
 Helicrenion reticulatum Warén & Bouchet, 1993
 Retiskenea diploura Warén & Bouchet, 2001

See also
The other superfamily of hydrothermal vent limpets is the Lepetodriloidea.

References

External links
 Steffen Kiel (2010), The Vent and Seep Biota: Aspects from Microbes to Ecosystems, Nature
 Thomas Kunze, Martin Hess, Martin Brückner, Friederike Beck & Gerhard Haszprunar, Skeneimorph gastropods in Neomphalina and Vetigastropoda — A preliminary report, Zoosymposia 1: 119–131 (2008); ISSN 1178-9913

 
Gastropod superfamilies
Neomphalina
Marine gastropods